Anor, or Atemble, is a Ramu language of Papua New Guinea.

References

External links 
 PARADISEC open-access archive items in Anor language

Middle Ramu languages
Languages of Madang Province